Mamelodi, part of the City of Tshwane Metropolitan Municipality, is a township set up by the then apartheid government northeast of Pretoria, Gauteng, South Africa.

Etymology
"Mamelodi" is the name derived from the Sepedi word with the prefix being "ma" meaning mother, and the suffix "melodi" meaning melodies. Its meaning can be translated to mean Mother of Melodies.

History
The township was established when 16 houses were built on the farm Vlakfontein in June 1953 and later the name changed to Mamelodi. The Group Areas Act designated Mamelodi as a blacks-only area, though this became moot with the fall of Apartheid in 1994. In the 1960s black citizens were forcefully removed from the suburb of Lady Selbourne in Pretoria to Mamelodi, Ga-Rankuwa and Atteridgeville.  Anti-apartheid activist Reverend Nico Smith preached in Mamelodi from 1982 to 1989, and obtained permission to live there himself from 1985 to 1989.  During that period, he and his wife Ellen were the only whites legally allowed to live in Mamelodi.  The township still has vastly more blacks than any other group as of 2010.

Since 2001 Mamelodi has had a large AIDS outreach program helping several thousand orphans in the community. Mamelodi is home to the largest AIDS Hospice Center in South Africa with 140 beds available free of charge.

Education

Primary schools

 Moretele Primary School
 Agnes Chidi Primary School
 Dr Monare Primary School
 Mveledzo Primary School
 Sikhanyisele Primary School
 Meetse A Bophelo Primary School
 Mogale Primary School
 Bula-Dikgoro School
 Ramahlale Primary School
 Bajabulile Primary School
 Pula-difate Primary School
 Tlakukani Primary School
 F.F. Ribeiro Primary School
 N'wavangani Primary School
 Mahlasedi Masana Primary School
 Boikganthso Primary School
 Motheo Primary School
 Zakhele Primary school
 Botlhabatsatsi Primary School
 Zamintuthuko Primary School
 Umthombo Primary School
 Ezazi Primary School
 Tshimollo Primary School
 Ndima Primary School
 Sindawonye Primary School
 Pheladi Nakene Primary School
 Agnes Chidi Primary School
 Koos Matli Primary School
 Dr I.M Monare Primary School
Uaone Primary school
 Mahube Valley Primary School
 Shirinda Primary School
Emthunzini Primary School

legora primary school

Secondary and High Schools

 Mamelodi Secondary School
 Tsako-Thabo Secondary School
 Stanza Bopape Secondary School
 Vukani Mawethu Secondary School
 Vlakfontein Secondary School
 Bona Lesedi Secondary School
 Gatang Secondary School
 Jafta Mahlangu Secondary School
 Solomon Mahlangu Secondary School
 Rephafukgile Secondary School
 Mahube Valley Secondary School
 Ribane Laka High School
 Modiri Technical High School
 Lehlabile High School
 J.Kekana High School
 Phateng Comprehensive School
LESEDI

Tertiary Education

Tshwane North TVET College has 6 campuses, one of which is based in the east of Mamelodi in the section called BufferZone, next to Mamelodi Day Hospital. It used to be called Thuto Matlhale, then changed to Mamelodi College and now known after the merge as TNC Mamelodi Campus.

The University of Pretoria operates a campus in Mamelodi. The campus in Mamelodi was incorporated from Vista University into the University of Pretoria on 2 January 2004 as part of a government reshuffle of smaller institutions into larger ones.

The U.S. Embassy operates the Mae Jemison Science Reading Room in Mamelodi. This stand-alone building on the University of Pretoria campus has a small library, computers, and an auditorium. It is used for after-school reading, tutoring, and other activities by students in Mamelodi.

Society and Culture

Social Organisations
There are different organisations and groups that are working towards improving the standard of living and education levels within the township. One of them is Tateni Community Care Services, funded in 1995, that operates 10 Drop-in Centres, mostly in primary schools, to support young children. Furthermore, they have a youth development program to support youth in-and-out-of-school to work towards their "Breaking the Cycle of Poverty" approach. Another organization The Mamelodi Trust operates within five schools in the area. The Mamelodi Initiative, was founded in 2007 by Richard Kelly and Seikanelo Sedibane and it was launched in 2010, it focuses on providing after school and out-of-school time programming to Mamelodi residents through winter and summer holiday programmes, year-round computer courses, youth mentoring, and other opportunities for youth.
The Itsoseng Clinic was established in 1995 and continues to deliver a comprehensive psychological service to the local residents [www.psyssa.com/wp-content/uploads/2015/12/CaSP-Itsoseng-Clinic-article.pdf.]

Sport
The township is home to the Mamelodi Sundowns of the ABSA Premier League and the Mamelodi Bees Basketball of the South African Women's Basketball League.

The HM Pitje Stadium is located in Mamelodi.

Mamelodi is also home to Mamelodi Sundowns star George Lebese and Lucky Mohomi of Mamelodi Sundowns.

Mamelodi is also home to the 2003 Miss South Africa Joan Ramagoshi.

Life in Mamelodi
There are a lot of informal settlements in Mamelodi. The housing problem is so great in the area, but it is proving impossible to keep up with the demand.
The Rates of youth unemployment and drug use are high.

Crime in Mamelodi
Crime is also a major problem facing the community with poverty, unemployment and social issues being the major contributors. The community has been in the news for all the wrong reasons, like looting during strikes and destruction of public properties with the aim to get the attention of the government to speed up service delivery.

Outreach

One major outreach program in Mamelodi is the Viva Foundation. Viva works to support orphans and vulnerable children, as well as giving community members business and skills training. Viva's Mamelodi compound is host to a preschool, small store, kitchen, and safe house for orphans. Viva has also worked to produce a "living art gallery" by painting several homes surrounding the compound.

Another major outreach project situated on the University of Pretoria Mamelodi Campus is the Itsoseng Clinic, a psychological clinic providing free psychological services to the community of Pretoria.  The Clinic is a project of the University of Pretoria's Department of Psychology and is in operation since 1994.  The clinic collaborates with other helping services, i.e. policing services, hospitals, crisis centra, orphanages, hospices, etc. in the community to address issues related to poverty, crime, unemployment, such as substance and alcohol abuse, domestic violence, HIV/Aids related issues and learning and other difficulties.  This is the only psychological facility in the community offering free services to the community.  Services are provided by volunteers, students, interns and professional university staff.

Monuments
Solomon Mahlangu is commemorated in the Solomon Mahlangu Freedom Square in his hometown of Mamelodi, Pretoria. The square is focused on a bronze statue of Mahlangu. It is located in well maintained parklands on the corner of Maphalla Drive and Tsamaya Avenue.

Notable residents
Philip Tabane
Solomon Mahlangu (19561979)
Don Laka
Naledi Chirwa
Fana

References

External links
 Meanwhile in Mamelodi (2011), Documentary film about the daily life of a family in the Mamelodi township
 The Mamelodi Mesh, part of the Wireless Africa programme of the Meraka Institute

Townships in Gauteng
University of Pretoria campus
Populated places in the City of Tshwane
Populated places established in 1945